Laura Katariina Mononen (born Laura Katariina Ahervo 5 October 1984) is a retired Finnish cross-country skier.

Career
Mononen made her debut in the World Cup in the 2008–09 season in March in Lahti, Finland.

Her top finish at the World Cup was in 2014–15 where she finished third in Toblach on 8 January 2015.

She announced her retirement from cross-country skiing in May 2021.

Cross-country skiing results
All results are sourced from the International Ski Federation (FIS).

Olympic Games

World Championships
1 medal – (1 bronze)

World Cup

Season standings

Individual podiums
1 podium (1 )

Team podiums
5 podiums – (5 )

References

1984 births
Living people
Finnish female cross-country skiers
FIS Nordic World Ski Championships medalists in cross-country skiing
People from Lohja
Cross-country skiers at the 2018 Winter Olympics
Olympic cross-country skiers of Finland
Tour de Ski skiers
Sportspeople from Uusimaa
21st-century Finnish women